Samuel Alphonsius Stritch (August 17, 1887 – May 27, 1958) was an American Cardinal prelate of the Catholic Church. He served as archbishop of the Archdiocese of Chicago from 1940 to 1958 and as pro-prefect of the Sacred Congregation for Propagation of the Faith from March 1958 until his death two months later. He was elevated to the cardinalate by Pope Pius XII in 1946.

Early life and education
Samuel Stritch was born in Nashville, Tennessee, to Garret (Gerard) (1839–1896) and Katherine (née O'Malley) Stritch. His mother immigrated to the United States from Ireland with her parents at a young age, and settled in Louisville, Kentucky, where the family ran a boarding house. His father was born in Ballyheigue, Kerry but came to Louisville from Dublin in 1879, boarded with the O'Malleys, and married Katherine in 1880. Garret later worked as the manager of Sycamore Mills, a subsidiary of DuPont, in Nashville. The second youngest of eight children, Samuel had two brothers and five sisters and they attended the Church of the Assumption.

Considered something of a child prodigy, he finished grammar school at age 10 and high school at 14. In 1901, he entered St. Gregory's Preparatory Seminary in Cincinnati, Ohio, from where he obtained a Bachelor of Arts degree in 1903. Bishop Thomas Sebastian Byrne then sent Stritch to study at the Pontifical Urbanian Athenaeum De Propaganda Fide in Rome, where he resided at the Pontifical North American College. He later earned his doctorates in philosophy and in theology. While in Rome, he also befriended Eugenio Pacelli, who later became Pope Pius XII.

Priesthood
Stritch was ordained to the priesthood by Cardinal Pietro Respighi on May 21, 1910, at the Lateran Basilica. At age 22, he was below the age requirement for ordination but was granted a dispensation by Pope Pius X, who said, "[Stritch] is young in years but old in intelligence. Let him be ordained."

Upon returning to the United States, he did pastoral work in the Diocese of Nashville. He served as pastor of St. Patrick's Church in Memphis from 1911 to 1913, whence he became private secretary to Bishop Byrne. Stritch was named diocesan chancellor in March 1917, and a Domestic Prelate of His Holiness on May 10, 1921.

Episcopal career

Bishop of Toledo
On August 10, 1921, Stritch was appointed the second Bishop of Toledo, Ohio, by Pope Benedict XV. He received his episcopal consecration on the following November 30 from Archbishop Henry K. Moeller, with Bishops John Baptist Morris and Thomas Edmund Molloy serving as co-consecrators. At age 34, he was the youngest bishop in the United States at the time.

During his tenure in Toledo, Stritch established Mary Manse College in 1922 and incorporated the diocesan Catholic Charities in 1923. He also oversaw the beginning of the construction of Holy Rosary Cathedral, whose cornerstone was laid by János Cardinal Csernoch in 1926.

While in Toledo Stritch presided at the confirmation of Danny Thomas. Stritch would mentor Thomas throughout his life and urge him to locate St. Jude Children's Research Hospital in Memphis.

Archbishop of Milwaukee
Following the death of Sebastian Gebhard Messmer, Stritch was named the fifth archbishop of Milwaukee, Wisconsin, on August 26, 1930. He suffered from periods of depression early in his tenure, but joined nationwide feelings of optimism with the 1932 election of Franklin D. Roosevelt. Stritch was active in providing support to the victims of the Great Depression. It was because of the Depression that he refused to restore either the Cathedral of St. John the Evangelist, which was heavily damaged by a fire in 1935, or St. Francis Seminary.

Stritch was an advocate for Catholic Action and the Catholic Youth Organization. An opponent of the controversial Rev. Charles Coughlin, he once wrote a letter to a Milwaukee rabbi in which, making an implicit reference to Coughlin, the archbishop rebuked those who "gain and hold a popular audience, degrade themselves and abuse the trust reposed in them by misquoting, half-quoting, and actually insinuating half-truths." In November 1939, he was elected chairman of the National Catholic Welfare Conference, the predecessor of the United States Conference of Catholic Bishops. He also served as vice-chancellor of the Extension Society.

Archbishop of Chicago
Despite Stritch's protests, Pope Pius XII appointed him the fourth archbishop of Chicago, Illinois, on December 27, 1939. Succeeding the late Cardinal George Mundelein, Stritch was formally installed on January 3, 1940. He was the personal choice of Apostolic Delegate Amleto Giovanni Cicognani for the post, although President Roosevelt was reputed to have wanted Bishop Bernard James Sheil instead.

Pius XII created him Cardinal-Priest of Sant'Agnese fuori le mura in the consistory of February 18, 1946. As archbishop, Stritch oversaw the establishment of the first American chapter of the organization Opus Dei, the launching of the Christian Family Movement, and an outreach to the Puerto Rican community.

On July 21, 1952, he delivered the invocation at the opening session of the 1952 Democratic National Convention, saying "Today we face a crisis as grave as that of Valley Forge."  He asked for Divine protection against "the aggression of those within and without of Godless enslaving political systems and of those who wittingly or unwittingly seek to take away our freedoms by their advocacy of materialism and Godless humanism."

In July 1954, he issued a pastoral letter exhorting Illinois Catholics to abstain from the assembly of the World Council of Churches at Evanston, writing, "The Catholic Church does not...enter into any organization in which the delegates of many sects sit down in council or conference as equals...She does not allow her children to engage in any activity...based on the false assumption that Roman Catholics, too, are still searching for the truth of Christ," to the dismay of several Protestant and ecumenical figures. However, earlier in 1943, Stritch attended a peace program held by Protestant, Catholic, Eastern Orthodox, and Jewish leaders.

Pro-Prefect of the Congregation for the Propagation of Faith
On March 1, 1958, he was appointed pro-prefect of the Sacred Congregation for the Propagation of Faith, thus becoming the first American to head a dicastery of the Roman Curia. As pro-prefect, Stritch directed the Church's missionary efforts. In May that same year, a blood clot required the Cardinal's right arm to be amputated above the elbow. Following the operation, he suffered a stroke on May 19, and died eight days later, at age 70.

After lying in state at the North American College and the Cathedral of the Holy Name in Chicago, he was interred in the Bishops' Mausoleum at Mount Carmel Cemetery in Hillside, Illinois, on June 3.

Family
Entertainer Elaine Stritch was his first cousin once removed.

Legacy
Cardinal Stritch University in Milwaukee is named for him, as are Cardinal Stritch High School in Oregon, Ohio, a former junior and senior high school in Keokuk, Iowa, the Stritch School of Medicine at Loyola University Chicago, and Knights of Columbus 4th Degree Assembly, Samuel Cardinal Stritch Assembly #205.

See also

 Catholic Church hierarchy
 Catholic Church in the United States
 Historical list of the Catholic bishops of the United States
 List of Catholic bishops of the United States
 Lists of patriarchs, archbishops, and bishops

References

External links
Official site of the Holy See

1887 births
1958 deaths
21st-century American cardinals
American Roman Catholic clergy of Irish descent
Roman Catholic archbishops of Chicago
Roman Catholic archbishops of Milwaukee
Burials at the Bishop's Mausoleum, Mount Carmel Cemetery (Hillside)
Cardinals created by Pope Pius XII
Catholics from Tennessee
Members of the Congregation for the Propagation of the Faith
People from Chicago
People from Nashville, Tennessee
Pontifical Urban University alumni
Religious leaders from Wisconsin
Roman Catholic bishops of Toledo
Religious leaders from Tennessee